Ulan-Ude railway station is the primary passenger railway station for the city of Ulan-Ude in the Republic of Buryatia in Russia, and an important stop along the Trans-Siberian Railway and Trans-Mongolian Railway.

Trains

Major Domestic Routes 
 Moscow — Vladivostok
 Novosibirsk — Vladivostok
 Moscow — Khabarovsk
 Novosibirsk — Neryungri
 Moscow — Ulan Ude
 Adler — Chita

International

References

Railway stations in Buryatia
Trans-Siberian Railway
Railway stations in the Russian Empire opened in 1900
Ulan-Ude